Bernd Bauchspieß (born 10 October 1939) is a former East German football player.

He played 264 matches in the East German top division and scored 120 goals. Only 8 players scored more in the history of the Oberliga.

Bauchspieß won one cap for East Germany in 1959 against Finland.

References

External links 
 
 
 
 

1949 births
Living people
German footballers
Association football forwards
East German footballers
East Germany international footballers
Olympic footballers of the United Team of Germany
Olympic bronze medalists for the United Team of Germany
Olympic medalists in football
Footballers at the 1964 Summer Olympics
Medalists at the 1964 Summer Olympics
Berliner FC Dynamo players
FC Sachsen Leipzig players
DDR-Oberliga players
People from Burgenlandkreis
Footballers from Saxony-Anhalt